San Marino competed at the 2013 Mediterranean Games in Mersin, Turkey from the 20th to 30 June 2013.

Bocce
Men's Singles: Matteo Albani: Silver
Men's Doubles: Bronze
Women's Singles: Anna Maria Ciucci: Silver
Women's Doubles: Bronze

References
http://info.mersin2013.gov.tr/medals_country.aspx?n=SMR

Nations at the 2013 Mediterranean Games
2013
Mediterranean Games